Astley Clarke is a British jewellery brand that was founded in London in 2006 by Bec Astley Clarke.  started as an online retailer, selling designer jewellery In 2009 Astley Clarke started designing their own jewellery, after employing a creative director, Lorna Watson. In 2014, following the appointment of a new CEO, Scott Thomson, Astley Clarke pivoted from being a pure play jewellery marketplace to a jewellery brand, selling jewellery designed only in-house in their London Studio. Astley Clarke is known for having contributed to the creation of the demi-fine category of jewellery and uses only Noble metals with coloured gemstones and 14k gold with diamonds. Pieces are designed to be layered and worn together with a relaxed luxury feel.

Astley Clarke won Retail Jeweller's ‘Jewellery Website of the Year’ award in 2008 and Walpole's ‘Best Luxury Brand Online’ award in 2009.
The brand has long-standing concession spaces in a number of iconic department stores across the UK, including Liberty, Selfridges and Fortnum & Mason. Google Apps for Work used Astley Clarke as a business case study in 2014 with a promotional video.

In 2019, the Aeternum Group GmbH acquired a majority stake in Astley Clarke and the brand now sits as part of a stable of European Jewellery Brands. In 2021, the brand opened its first flagship store in Monmouth St, Seven Dials, London. Known for being forward-thinking with technology initiatives, the brand launched an online charm builder in 2015 - an immersive online experience to personalise bracelets. Two years later, the collection Iconography launched with a technology that enabled customers to create mosaic-like images on pendants, using thousands of coloured diamonds. Astley Clarke's online locket personalisation feature is the latest in its pool of tech experiences, allowing customers to upload photographs and engravings to customise their locket directly through their website.

History

Bec Astley Clarke MBE  
Bec Astley Clarke MBE graduated from the University of Edinburgh with an MA in politics and philosophy then worked online and for luxury brands before founding Astley Clarke. Clarke was listed in Vanity Fair's 2010 jewellery power list  and was awarded Ernst and Young's 'Entrepreneur of the Year' Award for London and the South. Bec Astley Clarke sat on the board for International Jewellery London  and was a judge for the Bright Young Gems initiative. In 2013 Astley Clarke's founder, Bec Astley Clarke, was appointed MBE for services to the jewellery industry.

Charity Work

Theirworld 
Astley Clarke announced another charitable partnership with children's charity Theirworld in 2015. Theirworld was founded by Sarah Brown to support children's healthcare and education projects. Astley Clarke designed a bracelet incorporating the Theirworld charity logo, proceeds of which fund the charity.
The brand released an  about the collaboration.

In 2018, the brand unveiled a second design in collaboration with Theirworld, which has since become part of the core collection and sees 20% of proceeds go towards the children's charity.

World Land Trust 
Since 2017, and thanks to the work by previous Creative Director Dominic Jones, the brand has enjoyed a positive relationship and collaborative product development with the World Land Trust raising vital funds The brand recognises the importance of protecting and sustainably managing threatened areas of the natural habitat for endangered species and support the WLT in their mission to protect these areas and raise awareness.

Breast Cancer Now 
In June 2005, Astley Clarke announced a charitable collaboration with Breast Cancer Now (formerly Breast Cancer Campaign). They sold a bracelet of which proceeds were directed into research of the BRCA mutation. The bracelet was designed alongside blogger and BRCA spokesperson Emma Parlons.

References

British jewellery designers
2006 establishments in England
People educated at the City of London School for Girls